Carvalho's Surinam toad (Pipa carvalhoi) is a species of frog in the family Pipidae endemic to Brazil. Its natural habitats are subtropical or tropical dry forests, dry savanna, moist savanna, subtropical or tropical dry shrubland, subtropical or tropical moist shrubland, freshwater marshes, ponds, and aquaculture ponds. It is threatened by habitat loss.

References

Pipa (frog)
Endemic fauna of Brazil
Taxonomy articles created by Polbot
Amphibians described in 1937